William Wallace Johnson was a member of the Wisconsin State Assembly.

Biography
Johnson was born on November 29, 1813 in Buckland, Massachusetts. 
The eighth child (of thirteen children) and second son of Capt. Othniel and Anna (Elmer) Johnson.

On October 24, 1838, Johnson married Abigail Clark (1812-1889). They would have six children between 1841 and 1849 (five of whom reached adulthood). On May 17, 1842 he and his family settled in the territory of Wisconsin (Greenfield).

William Wallace Johnson was a school board member (1842-1848) and a teacher in the Greenfield township and constructed with his own hands the Honey Creek School in 1843 and the Johnson School in 1847. He also served as Town Treasurer (1847-1848) and Town Clerk (1848-1855). In 1859, he was ordained a minister of the Methodist Episcopal Church.  Also, from 1849 to 1900 he was Secretary of Honey Creek Cemetery Association.

Johnson died on September 6, 1900 in Greenfield, Wisconsin and he is buried in Honey Creek Cemetery in West Allis, Wisconsin.

Election to the Assembly
In the 1878 general election, Johnson ran as a Republican and would finish tied for first place with the Democratic candidate, Michael J. Egan, ahead of two others. A special election between Johnson and Egan was ordered by Governor William E. Smith. Johnson would emerge as the winner.

References

External links

People from Buckland, Massachusetts
People from Greenfield, Wisconsin
Religious leaders from Wisconsin
American Methodist clergy
19th-century Methodist ministers
Republican Party members of the Wisconsin State Assembly
19th-century American politicians
1813 births
1900 deaths
Burials in Wisconsin
19th-century American clergy